The Very Best of the Bee Gees is a greatest hits album by British/Australian pop group the Bee Gees. It was originally released in November 1990 by Polydor Records, around the time as the Tales from the Brothers Gibb box set. The album was primarily aimed at the European market, as shown by the exclusion of the US hits "Holiday", "I Started a Joke", "Lonely Days", "How Can You Mend a Broken Heart" and "Fanny (Be Tender with My Love)".

The album has been re-issued several times, including a 1996 version which dropped "You Win Again" and "Ordinary Lives" from the track listing.

Track listing

Charts

Weekly

Year-end

Certifications and sales

References

1990 greatest hits albums
Bee Gees compilation albums
Polydor Records compilation albums
Albums recorded at IBC Studios
Albums produced by Barry Gibb
Albums produced by Robin Gibb
Albums produced by Maurice Gibb
Albums produced by Robert Stigwood